Kwon Se-in (born June 29, 1982), better known by the stage name Kwon Yul, is a South Korean actor. He made his acting debut with a leading role in the 2007 high school sitcom Mackerel Run. Kwon is best known for his roles as Seo Ji-seok on the daily soap opera Angel's Revenge (2014), Yi Hoe in the blockbuster period film The Admiral: Roaring Currents (2014), and as Lee Sang-woo in the hit romantic comedy series Let's Eat 2 (2015).

Filmography

Film

TV Movies

Television series

Web series

Television show

Hosting

Music video

Theater

Awards and nominations

References

External links

 Kwon Yul at Saram Entertainment 

1982 births
Chung-Ang University alumni
Living people
South Korean male film actors
South Korean male stage actors
South Korean male television actors
South Korean male web series actors
21st-century South Korean male actors